Dontavius L. Jarrells is a Democratic member of the Ohio House of Representatives representing the 1st district. He was elected in 2020, defeating Republican Jim Burgess with 82% of the vote. Prior to his election to the Ohio House, Jarrells worked at the Franklin County Treasurer's Office as the Chief of Communications.

Ohio House of Representatives

Election
Jarrells was elected in the general election on November 3, 2020.

Committees
Jarrells serves on the following committees: Finance, Ways and Means, Insurance, and Behavioral Health and Recovery Supports. He also sits on the Finance Subcommittee on Higher Education.

Election history

References

Hiram College alumni
Living people
Democratic Party members of the Ohio House of Representatives
21st-century American politicians
Politicians from Columbus, Ohio
Year of birth missing (living people)
African-American state legislators in Ohio
21st-century African-American politicians